Port of Kolkata or Kolkata Port, officially known as Syama Prasad Mookerjee Port Trust (formerly Kolkata Port Trust), is the only riverine major port of India, located in the city of Kolkata, West Bengal, around  from the sea. It is the oldest operating port in India and was constructed by the British East India Company. Kolkata is a freshwater port with no variation in salinity. The port has two distinct dock systems — Kolkata Dock at Kolkata and a deep water dock at Haldia Dock Complex, Haldia.

In the 19th century, the Kolkata Port was the premier port in British India. After slavery was abolished in 1833, there was a high demand for labourers on sugar cane plantations in the British Empire.  From 1838 to 1917, the British used this port to ship off over half a million Indians from all over India — mostly from the Hindi Belt (especially Bhojpur and Awadh) — and take them to places across the world, such as Mauritius, Fiji, South Africa, Trinidad and Tobago, Guyana, Suriname, and other Caribbean islands as indentured labourers. There are millions of Indo-Mauritians, Indo-Fijians, and Indo-Caribbean people in the world today.

After independence, the port's importance decreased because of factors including the Partition of Bengal (1947), reduction in the size of the port hinterland, and economic stagnation in eastern India.

It has a vast hinterland comprising the entire North East of India including West Bengal, Bihar, Jharkhand, Uttar Pradesh, Madhya Pradesh, Assam, North East Hill States and two landlocked neighbouring countries namely, Nepal and Bhutan and also the Autonomous Region of Tibet (China). With the turn of the 21st century, the volume of throughput has again started increasing steadily. As of March 2018, the port is capable of processing annually 650,000 containers, mostly from Nepal, Bhutan, and India's northeastern states.

History

In the early 16th century, the Portuguese first used the present location of the port to anchor their ships, since they found the upper reaches of the Hooghly river, beyond Kolkata, unsafe for navigation. Job Charnock, an employee and administrator of the British East India Company, is believed to have founded a trading post at the site in 1690. Since the area was situated on the river with jungle on three sides, it was considered safe from enemy invasion. After the abolition of slavery in the British Empire in 1833, this port was used to ship lakhs of Indians as 'indentured labourers' to far-flung territories throughout the Empire.

After slavery was abolished in 1833, there was a high demand for labourers on sugar cane plantations in the British Empire.  From 1838 to 1917, the British used this port to ship off over half a million Indians from all over India — mostly from the Hindi Belt (especially Bhojpur and Awadh) — and take them to places across the world, such as Mauritius, Fiji, South Africa, Trinidad and Tobago, Guyana, Suriname, and other Caribbean islands as indentured labourers. There are millions of Indo-Mauritians, Indo-Fijians, and Indo-Caribbean people in the world today.

As Kolkata grew in size and importance, merchants in the city demanded the setting up of a port trust in 1863. The colonial government formed a River Trust in 1866, but it soon failed, and administration was again taken up by the government. Finally, in 1870, the Calcutta Port Act (Act V of 1870) was passed, creating the offices of Calcutta Port Commissioners. In 1869 and 1870, eight jetties were built on the Strand. A wet dock was set up at Khidirpur in 1892. The Khidirpur Dock II was completed in 1902. As cargo traffic at the port grew, so did the requirement of more kerosene, leading to the building of a petroleum wharf at Budge Budge in 1896. In 1925, the Garden Reach jetty was added to accommodate greater cargo traffic. A new dock, named King George's Dock, was commissioned in 1928 (it was renamed Netaji Subhash Dock in 1973).Though the port was conceived to be a commercial port and gateway of eastern India, the port played a very important role in the Second World War. It was bombed twice by the Japanese forces. After independence, the Commissioners for the Port of Kolkata were responsible for the port till January 1975 when Major Port Trusts Act, 1963, came into force. The Port is now run by a Board of Trustees having representatives from the Government, Trade Bodies, various Port Users, Labour Unions and some nominated members. On 12 January 2020, the port was renamed to Syama Prasad Mookerjee Port by Prime Minister Narendra Modi on the occasion of 150 years of operation of Kolkata Port at Netaji Indoor Stadium.

The port is part of the 21st Century Maritime Silk Road that runs from the Chinese coast via the Suez Canal to the Mediterranean, there to the Upper Adriatic region of Trieste with its rail connections to Central and Eastern Europe.

Terminals

Dock systems
The Kolkata Port Trust (KoPT) manages two separate dock agglomerations, the Kolkata Dock System (KDS) and the Haldia Dock Complex (HDC).

Kolkata Dock System

The pilotage station is at Gasper/ Saugor roads, 145 Kilometres to the south of the KDS (around 58 km from the sea). The system consists of: 
 Kidderpore Docks (K.P. Docks) : 18 Berths,  6 Buoys / Moorings and 3 Dry Docks
 Netaji Subhas Docks (N.S. Docks): 10 Berths,  2 Buoys / Moorings and 2 Dry Docks
 Budge Budge River Moorings :  6 Petroleum Wharves
 Anchorages : Diamond Harbour, Saugor Road, Sandheads

Apart from this, there are around 80 major riverine jetties, and many minor jetties, and a large number of ship breaking berths.

Haldia Dock Complex

The complex consists of:
 Impounded Dock. System with 12 Berths
 3 Oil Jetties in the River
 3 Barge Jetties in the River for handling Oil carried by Barges.
 Haldia Anchorage for lash vessels.

All the docks are impounded dock systems with locks from river.

Dry Dock
KoPT has the largest dry dock facility in India . These dry docks cater to the diverse repair and maintenance needs of the vessels calling on the Eastern Ports of India. In addition, shipbuilding facilities are also available in these dry docks. All the dry docks are inside the impounded dock system. There are five dry docks of which three are in Kidderpore Dock and two are in Netaji Subhas Dock.

There is a fully-fledged repair workshop including Diesel Engine Overhauling Unit, Structural Shop, Heavy and Light Machine Shop, Forging Shop, Electrical Shop and a Chain Testing/Repair Shop with 2500 KN capacity Tensile Compression Testing Machine to support various activities in the dry dock.

Pilotage
Due to the constraints of the river (like silting, sandbars etc.) no seagoing vessel above 200 GT is allowed to navigate without a qualified pilot of the Kolkata Port Trust.

Navigational Aids

Lighthouse
 Sagar Lighthouse is situated at Middleton Point on the Sagar Island  inshore.
 Dariapur Lighthouse is situated on the right bank of Hooghly River south of Rasulpur river and about  inshore.

Light Vessels
 There are four unmanned light vessels to aid in navigation.
 U.G.L.F. located at 
 L.G.L.F. located at 
 Talent WK L.V. located at 
 Eastern Channel L.V. located at

Automatic Tide Gauges
These are maintained at Tribeni, Garden Reach, Diamond Harbour and Haldia for round-the-clock recording of tidal data, which is used for the prediction of tides and preparation of tide tables by Survey of India.

Semaphores
These are maintained at Akra, Moyapur, Hooghly Point, Balari, Gangra and Sagar for displaying rises of tide for the convenience of various vessels navigating, dredging and surveying in the River Hooghly. The semaphores used to display the tide level at these localities on a mast by the position of the meter and decimeter arms which were manually rotated with the rise and fall of every decimeter of tidal level. However these semaphores are no longer functional and instead, tidal levels are broadcast over VHF radio every half an hour from all the above stations except at Balari.

River Marks and Buoys
A total of 500 (of which 140 are lighted) River Marks and Buoys are maintained by the KoPT. These are extremely useful in facilitating night navigation, pilotage and dredging. These lights are operated either by grid electricity, by battery or by dissolved Marine Acetylene Gas. There is also 1 boat buoy, 30 lighted buoys and 72 unlit buoys marking the navigational channel from Sandheads to Kolkata. It has one of the longest navigational channels in the world.

Differential Global Positioning System
In the wide estuary, position fixing with reference to shore objects to be viewed from the deck of a vessel, is very difficult. In 1983 KoPT introduced the Electronic Position Fixing System "Syledis" for position fixing of the vessels plying in the wide estuary of the Hooghly river. The shore-based Syledis Position Fixing System was functioning round the clock with the help of the Syledis Stations located at Haldia, Raichak, Dadanpatra Bar and Frazergunj. The system was effectively utilized for the purpose of hydrographic survey and dredging. KoPT has now replaced the Syledis Position Fixing System by Differential GPS (Differential Global Position Fixing System). This latest state-of the art technology provides improved location accuracy of up to 10 cm.

Satellite ports

Connections

Kolkata Dock System Railway (KDS Railway) 
KDS Railway was set up to cater to the traffic needs for docks, warehouses in the vicinity and various public and private sidings located around the Kolkata docks system. It works as a terminal agent of Indian Railways and operationally under Sealdah Division of Eastern Railway. KDS Rly has a working Agreement with Eastern Railway and render services to the users on behalf of them. Though KDS railway initially had many interfaces with Eastern Railway/South Eastern Railway and covered a wide range of area including Chitpur, Shalimar, and Garden Reach, at present its operation is truncated in the dock area only with the sole marshalling yard at East Dock Junction (EJC).

It is connected with Eastern Railway through the Majerhat railway station. Indian Railways bring traffic for KDS through full fledged goods trains (rakes) in the East Dock Junction (EJC), by their locomotives. Thereafter KDS railway, after necessary documentation and certain mechanical work, place the trains in the respective handling points (inside docks or private sidings), in full or installments as per operational feasibility. After completion of loading/unloading operation at Sheds/Docks/sidings etc, the rakes are hauled out and outward  trains are formed at the marshalling yard (EJC). Again, after documentation, the outward rakes are dispatched by the locomotives provided by Eastern Railway.

Statistics

In the fiscal year 2013–14, Port of Kolkata handled  of cargo. However, the number of vessels handled at Kolkata Port during 2013–2014 was the highest among all Indian Major Ports. KoPT handled 17.1% of the total number of vessels, which worked at Indian Major Ports in 2011–2012; significant improvement over 2011-12 which was 16%. During the fiscal year 20112012, 3183 vessels called at KoPT.

The average turn around time per vessel was 4.18 days for Kolkata Dock System and 3.37 for Haldia Dock Complex.

See also
 Farakka Port
 Ports in India
 Ports in West Bengal
 Sagar Port
 Tajpur Port

References

External links

Kolkata Port Trust

Transport in Kolkata
Kolkata
World War II sites in India
1870 establishments in India
Buildings and structures in Kolkata
River ports of India